Huntley High School is a public high school in Huntley, Illinois, United States. The catchment area includes Consolidated School District 158, which includes all of Huntley as well as parts of Lake in the Hills, Algonquin, and other surrounding communities and rural areas.

The Building

The current building, located at 13719 Harmony Road in Huntley, was constructed in 1997, and at the time was the school district's first new building in about 30 years.  It was originally designed as a middle-high school, with a shared cafeteria and library in the center of the building. The original high school building, located on Mill Street in Huntley, was built in the 1960s and only featured about a dozen classrooms and outdated facilities.  In the 1990s, the district's enrollment increased with suburban growth, and the school facilities needed to be expanded. After the new building was built in 1997, the old building served grades 4–5, before finally being converted into a recreational center when it was sold to the Huntley Park District in the early 2000s.

Additions
In 1999, the building's first major addition was a 12 classroom wing on the west end designed for temporary usage for grades 5 through 8.  In 2005, when the new elementary and middle schools were built, this wing served the high school's mathematics, foreign language, and social studies classes.

In 2002, substantial additions were made to both the west and east sides of the building.  On the west end, was a second wing which created a new main office for the high school, special education classrooms, high school science labs and classrooms, and eighth grade classrooms.  A four-classroom wing housing health classrooms and a computer lab connected the two western wings and completely surrounded the west gym (middle school gym).

The east addition provided the high school with a much larger gym, art and music classrooms, a 700-seat auditorium, student facilities and administrative offices.

In 2005, upon completion of the district's two new middle schools, the use of the building was allocated to high school classrooms and services only. Space has already been dedicated for an additional high school at the Square Barn Road Campus in Algonquin, Illinois.

Athletic complex
The school's athletic complex includes a football field and track, Field house with track and basketball courts, wrestling mat room, administrative and  maintenance buildings, three softball fields, two baseball fields, ten tennis courts, a practice football field, and two soccer fields in front.

Performing Arts Center
The Performing Arts Center was built as part of an addition to the school in 2002 and features approximately 700 seats. The tone of the theater is dominated by red and black, the school's colors. In addition to the stage and seating areas, the theater also features an orchestra pit, backstage rooms, and balconies. The center hosts high school plays, middle school plays, musical performances, performances from outside groups, assemblies, presentations, and award ceremonies.

Mascot
Until 2002, Huntley High School's mascot had been the Huntley Redskins. In the late 1990s, the school district faced threats of legal action by Native American groups claiming the mascot was a racial slur and in 2002 its use was abolished. A new mascot was adopted in 2002 as a closer option to the original mascot. The Huntley High School mascot is now a Red Raider, naming them, the "Huntley Red Raiders".

Student life
Students enjoy a variety of activities.

Academics
According to School District 158's Report Card (for the year 2009), Huntley High School exceeds to State of Illinois average in most academic areas.

The average ACT composite score at Huntley High School was 22.4 out of 36 in 2009, exceeding the average in Illinois.

The school's Prairie State Achievement Examination (PSAE) scores were all above the state average in 2009. In the reading category, Huntley had an average of 160 compared to the state average of 157. In the science category, Huntley's average was 163 while the state had an average of 157. As for the mathematics category, Huntley's average was 160 compared to the state average of 157.

Huntley High School's graduation rate is 98.4%, exceeding the state's average of 78% in 2009.

Activities and athletics
Huntley High School offers a number of sports and extra-curricular activities:

Orchesis
Boys Baseball
Boys and Girls Basketball
Boys and Girls Bowling
Cheerleading
Chess Team
Boys and Girls Cross Country
Football
Boys and Girls Golf
Boys and Girls Lacrosse
Poms
Boys and Girls Soccer
Girls Softball
Boys and Girls Tennis
Track and Field
Girls Volleyball
Boys and Girls Swimming
Wrestling

Academic Team
Band
Chorus
Color Guard
Community Service Club
Guitar Club
Gay-Straight Alliance (GSA)
JOY (Jesus, Others, You) Club
Journalism
Math Team
Model United Nations
National Honor Society
Musicals
Plays
Science Olympiad
Speech Team
Student Council
Philosophy Club
Red Raider Robotics

For a number of years, Huntley High School was part of the Big Northern Conference which  comprised twelve small-town schools in North Central Illinois. As Huntley High School's enrollment approached 1,000 in the early 2000s, it became class AA and joined the much larger suburban Fox Valley Conference in 2002.

Notable alumni
 Amanze Egekeze, professional basketball player
 Rachel Recchia, American reality television personality

References

External links
 Huntley High School
 Huntley High School's Student Newspaper "The Voice"

Schools in McHenry County, Illinois
Public high schools in Illinois
School buildings completed in 1997
1997 establishments in Illinois